is a Kofun period burial mound located in the Onoe neighborhood of Kita-ku, Okayama,  Okayama Prefecture, in the San'yō region of Japan.

Overview
It is located at the southeastern end of Kibi no Nakayama, an independent hill to the west of Okayama city.The tumulus is orientated to the east, has a total length of about 138.5 meters, and a round posterior portion with a diameter of about 96 meters and a height of about 11 meters and was built in three stages. The anterior part has a width of 52 meters, height of nine meters and was built in two stages. Fukiishi and shards of  cylindrical haniwa have been found, and it is presumed that there is a 20-meter long extension on the north side of the mound. The tumulus has not been excavated, but has a pit-style stone burial chamber perpendicular to the main axis of the mound in the center of the round posterior portion. Based on its shape and the haniwa uncovered, the tumulus was constructed in the middle or latter half of the 4th century, in the first half of the early Kofun period. As it was situated on the shore of the Seto Inland Sea when completed, it is speculated that its was intended to be seen by maritime traffic as an indication of the power of the ancient Kingdom of Kibi. 

Total length 138.5 meters:
Anterior rectangular portion 52 meters wide x 9 meters high x 2 steps
Constriction width 38 meters
Posterior circular portion 96 meter diameter x 11 meters high x 3 steps

See also
List of Historic Sites of Japan (Okayama)

References

External links

Okayama City home page
Okayama Prefecture home page

History of Okayama Prefecture
Okayama
Historic Sites of Japan
Archaeological sites in Japan
Kofun